Schodnia  is a village in the administrative district of Gmina Ozimek, within Opole County, Opole Voivodeship, in south-western Poland. 

References

Schodnia